John Boyes may refer to:

John H. Boyes (1886–1958), New Zealand Public Service Commissioner
John Boyes (musician) (born 1966), English progressive rock guitarist and photographer
John Frederick Boyes (1811–1879), English classical scholar

See also
John Boys (disambiguation)